Cerignale (locally) is a comune (municipality) in the Province of Piacenza in the Italian region Emilia-Romagna, located about  west of Bologna and about  southwest of Piacenza.

The municipality of Cerignale contains the frazioni (subdivisions, mainly villages and hamlets) Cà d'Abrà, Cariseto, Carisasca, Casale, Castello, La Serra, Lisore, Loc. Madonna, Oneto, Ponte Organasco, Rovereto, Santa Maria, Selva, and Zermogliana.

Cerignale borders the following municipalities: Brallo di Pregola, Corte Brugnatella, Ferriere, Ottone, Zerba.

Demographic evolution

References

External links
 www.comune-cerignale-pc.it/
 Castello di Cariseto

Cities and towns in Emilia-Romagna